Of Gods and Men may refer to:

 Of Gods and Men (film), a 2010 French drama film
 Star Trek: Of Gods and Men, a three-part unofficial Star Trek fan mini-series